Southern hospitality is a phrase used in American English to describe a positive stereotype of residents of the Southern United States.

Southern hospitality may also refer to:

 "Southern Hospitality" (song), a song by Ludacris
 Southern Hospitality (album), a 2008 album by Disciple, or the title song
 Southern Hospitality/Jeri Gently Jumps, a 2008 re-release of two 1950s albums by Jeri Southern